The Luxembourg women's national basketball team represents Luxembourg in international women's basketball tournaments. The national team is controlled by the Luxembourg Basketball Federation. The Luxembourg women's national team played at the 2018 FIBA Women's European Championship for Small Countries, and won the silver medal.

References

External links
Official website 
Luxembourg at FIBA site
Luxembourg National Team - Women at Eurobasket.com

Basketball in Luxembourg
Women's national basketball teams
1946 establishments in Luxembourg
B